Phylloecus (formerly Hartigia) is a genus of sawflies belonging to the family Cephidae.

The genus was first described by Edward Newman in 1838. In 2014, the genus Hartigia Schiødte, 1839 was reclassified as a junior synonym of Phylloecus.

Species
The following species are included in the genus:
 Phylloecus agilis (F. Smith, 1874)
 Phylloecus albotegularis (Wei & Nie, 1996)
 Phylloecus algiricus André, 1881
 Phylloecus bicinctus Provancher, 1875
 Phylloecus cheni (Wei & Nie, 1999)
 Phylloecus coreanus (Takeuchi, 1938)
 Phylloecus cowichanus (Ries, 1937)
 Phylloecus elevatus (Maa, 1944)
 Phylloecus epigonus (Zhelochovtsev, 1961)
 Phylloecus etorofensis (Takeuchi, 1955)
 Phylloecus fasciatus (Cresson, 1880)
 Phylloecus faunus Newman, 1838
 Phylloecus kamijoi (Shinohara, 1999)
 Phylloecus linearis (Schrank, 1781)
 Phylloecus mexicanus (Guerin, [1844])
 Phylloecus minutus (Wei & Nie, 1997)
 Phylloecus niger (M. Harris, [1779])
 Phylloecus nigratus (Dovnar-Zapolskij, 1931)
 Phylloecus nigritus (Forsius, 1918)
 Phylloecus nigrotibialis (Wei & Nie, 1977)
 Phylloecus pyrrha (Zhelochovtsev, 1968)
 Phylloecus riesi (D. R. Smith, 1986)
 Phylloecus sibiricola Jakovlev, 1891
 Phylloecus simulator (Kokujev, 1910)
 Phylloecus stackelbergi (Gussakovskij, 1945)
 Phylloecus stigmaticalis (Wei & Nie, 1996)
 Phylloecus trimaculatus (Say, 1824)
 Phylloecus viator (F. Smith, 1874)
 Phylloecus xanthostoma (Eversmann, 1847)
 Phylloecus zhengi (Wei & Nie, 1996)

References

Cephidae
Sawfly genera
Taxa named by Edward Newman